Nigel Alberto Zúniga Hontar (born 9 June 1972) is a former Honduran football player who played as a defender.

Club career
Known by his powerful left foot and excellent defensive and offensive work, Zúniga has excelled in his career in the Honduran football. He started his career in Platense F.C., moving to C.D. Petrotela, C.D.S. Vida, F.C. Motagua, Real Maya, Real C.D. España and C.D. Marathón.

He managed to be champion with Motagua (1997-98 Apertura) and Marathón (2001-02 Clausura).

International career
Zúniga made his debut for Honduras in a March 1996 friendly match and has earned a total of 5 caps, scoring no goals. He has represented his country at the 1998 CONCACAF Gold Cup.

His final international was a May 2000 friendly match against Canada.

Retirement
Now, Zúniga serves as pastor of churches and coach children's soccer teams.

References

External links

1971 births
Living people
People from Tela
Association football defenders
Honduran footballers
Honduras international footballers
1998 CONCACAF Gold Cup players
Platense F.C. players
C.D.S. Vida players
F.C. Motagua players
Real Maya players
Real C.D. España players
C.D. Marathón players